Mount Airy is an unincorporated community in St. John the Baptist Parish, Louisiana, United States. Its ZIP code is 70076.

Notes

Unincorporated communities in St. John the Baptist Parish, Louisiana
Unincorporated communities in Louisiana
Unincorporated communities in New Orleans metropolitan area